Berrien is a commune in the Finistère department of Brittany in north-western France.

Population
Inhabitants of Berrien are called Berriennois in French.

See also
Communes of the Finistère department
Parc naturel régional d'Armorique

References

External links

 Mayors of Finistère Association  ;

Communes of Finistère